was a city located in Ibaraki Prefecture, Japan.

As of 2003, the city had an estimated population of 42,813 and the density of 471.92 persons per km². The total area was 90.72 km².

On March 22, 2005, Iwai, along with the town of Sashima (from Sashima District), was merged to create the city of Bandō and no longer exists as an independent municipality.

The city was founded on April 1, 1972.

External links
 Official website of Bandō 

Dissolved municipalities of Ibaraki Prefecture
Bandō, Ibaraki